Bianca Elissa Sierra García (born 25 June 1992) is an American-born Mexican professional footballer who plays as a centre back for Liga MX Femenil club Tigres UANL and the Mexico women's national football team.

Early life

Bianca Sierra is the daughter of Alberto Sierra and Rosa García. They manage several Mexican restaurants in the San Francisco Bay Area. Sierra played forward, midfield, and centerback in high school from her freshman through junior years and with the Mustang Spirit, a girl's club team, in 2009.

College
Sierra played with the Auburn Tigers of the Auburn University from 2010 to 2013 and was a starting center back for the last three of her four years on the Auburn Tigers women's soccer team.  She played in a total of 85 matches and scored five goals and seven assists.

Professional career

National Women's Soccer League

Sierra was not among the 36 college soccer players drafted by the NWSL in January 2014.  She showed up at tryouts for the Washington Spirit, played in several pre-season games, and was signed to a contract for the 2014 season on 4 April 2014. On 18 June 2014, the Washington Spirit traded Sierra to the Boston Breakers in exchange for forward and Australian international Lisa De Vanna and an international roster spot until the end of the 2014 NWSL season.

Toppserien
Sierra joined the first division Norwegian club Arna-Bjørnar in March 2016.

Úrvalsdeild
Sierra signed for Icelandic Úrvalsdeild kvenna team Þór/KA in March 2017. She played 18 games during the 2017 Úrvalsdeild kvenna season, scoring two goals and helping the club to the national championship. In November 2017, Sierra resigned with Þór/KA for the 2018 season.

Mexico women's national soccer team
Sierra was a member of the Under-20 Mexico women's national football team from 2009 to 2012. She played in all eight matches for Mexico in the 2010 FIFA U-20 Women's World Cup in Germany and the 2012 FIFA U-20 Women's World Cup in Japan. Her teams advanced to the quarterfinals in both events.

In 2013 Sierra was selected to be a member of the Mexico women's national football team and played in friendly matches against Canada and the United States.  In 2014, she was on the roster of the Mexico team at the Four Nations Tournament in China.

Personal life
In June 2016, Sierra announced publicly she was in a relationship with fellow Mexico women's national teammate Stephany Mayor.  Sierra and Mayor are believed to be the first openly gay athletes in Mexico history. In 2015, Mexican coach, Leonardo Cuellar, had warned Sierra and Mayor to avoid any "stunts" or "holding hands."  In 2016, Mayor was not selected by Cuellar to play for the Mexico national team and Sierra declined to play on the national team. Mayor departed Mexico to play in Iceland. Sierra later joined her in Iceland.

Mayor rejoined the Mexico national team, under new coach Roberto Medina, for a match against Venezuela on 10 June 2017. Sierra rejoined the national team shortly thereafter.

References

External links
 
 
 
 
 

1992 births
Living people
Citizens of Mexico through descent
Mexican women's footballers
Women's association football central defenders
Arna-Bjørnar players
Bianca Sierra
Tigres UANL (women) footballers
Toppserien players
Úrvalsdeild kvenna (football) players
Liga MX Femenil players
Mexico women's international footballers
2015 FIFA Women's World Cup players
Pan American Games competitors for Mexico
Footballers at the 2019 Pan American Games
Mexican expatriate women's footballers
Mexican expatriate sportspeople in Norway
Expatriate women's footballers in Norway
Mexican expatriate sportspeople in Iceland
Expatriate women's footballers in Iceland
Lesbian sportswomen
LGBT association football players
Mexican LGBT sportspeople
People from Mountain View, California
Sportspeople from Santa Clara County, California
Soccer players from California
American women's soccer players
Auburn Tigers women's soccer players
Washington Spirit players
Boston Breakers players
National Women's Soccer League players
American expatriate women's soccer players
American expatriate sportspeople in Norway
American expatriate sportspeople in Iceland
American sportspeople of Mexican descent
American LGBT sportspeople
LGBT people from California
LGBT Hispanic and Latino American people
21st-century LGBT people
Pan American Games bronze medalists for Mexico
Medalists at the 2015 Pan American Games
Footballers at the 2015 Pan American Games
Pan American Games medalists in football